The 2010 United States House of Representatives elections in California were held on November 2, 2010 to determine who would represent California's various congressional districts in the United States House of Representatives. In the 112th Congress, California has 53 seats in the House, apportioned accordingly after the 2000 United States Census. Representatives were elected to two-year terms; those elected serve in the 112th Congress from January 3, 2011 to January 3, 2013.

According to CQ Politics, the districts considered the most competitive are the 3rd and 11th, with the 44th, 45th, and 47th as less than safe as well. The Cook Report includes the 18th and 20th.

Two districts elected new Representatives that year. Republican George Radanovich of the 19th district was succeeded by Republican Jeff Denham, and Democrat Diane Watson of the 33rd district was succeeded by Democrat Karen Bass. However, the partisan balance of the state's congressional delegation did not change, despite the strong Republican dominance in a multitude of other areas of the country.

Overview

By district
Results of the 2010 United States House of Representatives elections in California by district:

Districts

District 1 
 (map) has been represented by Democrat Mike Thompson of St. Helena since January 3, 1999.
Race ranking and details from CQ Politics
Campaign contributions from OpenSecrets
Race profile at The New York Times

District 2 
 (map) has been represented by Republican Wally Herger of Chico since January 3, 1987.
Race ranking and details from CQ Politics
Campaign contributions from OpenSecrets
Race profile at The New York Times

District 3 
 (map) has been represented by Republican Dan Lungren of Gold River since January 3, 2005. In May 2016, Babulal Bera, Ami Bera's father, pleaded guilty to two felony counts of election fraud affecting the 2010 and 2012 elections, and was convicted of illegally funneling $250,000 to Bera's campaigns between 2010 and 2012.
Race ranking and details from CQ Politics
Campaign contributions from OpenSecrets
Race profile at The New York Times

District 4 
 (map) has been represented by Republican Tom McClintock of Roseville since January 3, 2009.
Race ranking and details from CQ Politics
Campaign contributions from OpenSecrets
Race profile at The New York Times

District 5 
 (map) has been represented by Democrat Doris Matsui of Sacramento since March 8, 2005.
Race ranking and details from CQ Politics
Campaign contributions from OpenSecrets
Race profile at The New York Times

District 6 
 (map) has been represented by Democrat Lynn Woolsey of Petaluma since January 3, 1993.
Race ranking and details from CQ Politics
Campaign contributions from OpenSecrets
Race profile at The New York Times

District 7 
 (map) has been represented by Democrat George Miller of Martinez since January 3, 1975.
Race ranking and details from CQ Politics
Campaign contributions from OpenSecrets
Race profile at The New York Times

District 8 
 (map) has been represented by Democrat Nancy Pelosi of San Francisco since January 3, 1993, when she was redistricted from the 5th district.
Race ranking and details from CQ Politics
Campaign contributions from OpenSecrets
Race profile at The New York Times

District 9 
 (map) has been represented by Democrat Barbara Lee of Oakland since April 7, 1998.
Race ranking and details from CQ Politics
Campaign contributions from OpenSecrets
Race profile at The New York Times

District 10 
 (map) has been represented by Democrat John Garamendi of Walnut Grove since November 5, 2009.
CA - District 10 from OurCampaigns.com
Race ranking and details from CQ Politics
Campaign contributions from OpenSecrets
Race profile at The New York Times

District 11
 (map) has been represented by Democrat Jerry McNerney of Pleasanton since January 3, 2007.
Race ranking and details from CQ Politics
Campaign contributions from OpenSecrets
Race profile at The New York Times

District 12
 (map) has been represented by Democrat Jackie Speier of Hillsborough since April 10, 2008.
Race ranking and details from CQ Politics
Campaign contributions from OpenSecrets
Race profile at The New York Times

District 13
 (map) has been represented by Democrat Pete Stark of Fremont since January 3, 1993, when he was redistricted from the 9th district.
Race ranking and details from CQ Politics
Campaign contributions from OpenSecrets
Race profile at The New York Times

District 14
 (map) has been represented by Democrat Anna Eshoo of Atherton since January 3, 1993.
Race ranking and details from CQ Politics
Campaign contributions from OpenSecrets
Race profile at The New York Times

District 15
 (map) has been represented by Democrat Mike Honda of San Jose since January 3, 2001.
Race ranking and details from CQ Politics
Campaign contributions from OpenSecrets
Race profile at The New York Times

District 16
 (map) has been represented by Democrat Zoe Lofgren of San Jose since January 3, 1993.
Race ranking and details from CQ Politics
Campaign contributions from OpenSecrets
Race profile at The New York Times

District 17
 (map) has been represented by Democrat Sam Farr of Carmel-by-the-Sea since June 8, 1993.
Race ranking and details from CQ Politics
Campaign contributions from OpenSecrets
Race profile at The New York Times

District 18
 (map) has been represented by Democrat Dennis Cardoza of Atwater since January 3, 2003.
Race ranking and details from CQ Politics
Campaign contributions from OpenSecrets
Race profile at The New York Times

District 19
 (map) has been represented by Republican George Radanovich of Mariposa since January 3, 1995. Radanovich did not run for reelection.
Race ranking and details from CQ Politics
Campaign contributions from OpenSecrets
Race profile at The New York Times

District 20
 (map) has been represented by Democrat Jim Costa of Fresno since January 3, 2005.
Race ranking and details from CQ Politics
Campaign contributions from OpenSecrets
Race profile at The New York Times

District 21
 (map) has been represented by Republican Devin Nunes of Tulare since January 3, 2003.
Race ranking and details from CQ Politics
Campaign contributions from OpenSecrets
Race profile at The New York Times

District 22
 (map) has been represented by Republican Kevin McCarthy of Bakersfield since January 3, 2007.
Race ranking and details from CQ Politics
Campaign contributions from OpenSecrets
Race profile at The New York Times

District 23
 (map) has been represented by Democrat Lois Capps of Santa Barbara since January 3, 2003, when she was redistricted from the 22nd district.
Race ranking and details from CQ Politics
Campaign contributions from OpenSecrets
Race profile at The New York Times

District 24
 (map) has been represented by Republican Elton Gallegly of Simi Valley since January 3, 2003, when he was redistricted from the 23rd district.
Race ranking and details from CQ Politics
Campaign contributions from OpenSecrets
Race profile at The New York Times

District 25
 (map) has been represented by Republican Howard McKeon of Santa Clarita since January 3, 1993.
Race ranking and details from CQ Politics
Campaign contributions from OpenSecrets
Race profile at The New York Times

District 26
 (map) has been represented by Republican David Dreier of San Dimas since January 3, 2003, when he was redistricted from the 28th district.
Race ranking and details from CQ Politics
Campaign contributions from OpenSecrets
Race profile at The New York Times

District 27
 (map) has been represented by Democrat Brad Sherman of Sherman Oaks since January 3, 2003, when he was redistricted from the 24th district.
Race ranking and details from CQ Politics
Campaign contributions from OpenSecrets
Race profile at The New York Times

District 28
 (map) has been represented by Democrat Howard Berman of North Hollywood since January 3, 2003, when he was redistricted from the 26th district.
Race ranking and details from CQ Politics
Campaign contributions from OpenSecrets
Race profile at The New York Times

District 29
 (map) has been represented by Democrat Adam Schiff of Burbank since January 3, 2003, when he was redistricted from the 27th district.
Race ranking and details from CQ Politics
Campaign contributions from OpenSecrets
Race profile at The New York Times

District 30
 (map) has been represented by Democrat Henry Waxman of Los Angeles since January 3, 2003, when he was redistricted from the 29th district.
Race ranking and details from CQ Politics
Campaign contributions from OpenSecrets
Race profile at The New York Times

District 31
 (map) has been represented by Democrat Xavier Becerra of Los Angeles since January 3, 2003, when he was redistricted from the 30th district.
Race ranking and details from CQ Politics
Campaign contributions from OpenSecrets
Race profile at The New York Times

District 32
 (map) has been represented by Democrat Judy Chu of Monterey Park since July 14, 2009.
Race ranking and details from CQ Politics
Campaign contributions from OpenSecrets
Race profile at The New York Times

District 33
 (map) has been represented by Democrat Diane Watson of Los Angeles since January 3, 2003, when she was redistricted from the 32nd district. Watson did not run for reelection.
Race ranking and details from CQ Politics
Campaign contributions from OpenSecrets
Race profile at The New York Times

District 34
 (map) has been represented by Democrat Lucille Roybal-Allard of Los Angeles since January 3, 2003, when she was redistricted from the 33rd district.
Race ranking and details from CQ Politics
Campaign contributions from OpenSecrets
Race profile at The New York Times

District 35
 (map) has been represented by Democrat Maxine Waters of Los Angeles since January 3, 1993, when she was redistricted from the 29th district.
Race ranking and details from CQ Politics
Campaign contributions from OpenSecrets
Race profile at The New York Times

District 36
 (map) has been represented by Democrat Jane Harman of Venice since January 3, 2001.
Race ranking and details from CQ Politics
Campaign contributions from OpenSecrets
Race profile at The New York Times

District 37
 (map) has been represented by Democrat Laura Richardson of Long Beach since August 21, 2007.
Race ranking and details from CQ Politics
Campaign contributions from OpenSecrets
Race profile at The New York Times

District 38
 (map) has been represented by Democrat Grace Napolitano of Norwalk since January 3, 2003, when she was redistricted from the 34th district.
Race ranking and details from CQ Politics
Campaign contributions from OpenSecrets
Race profile at The New York Times

District 39
 (map) has been represented by Democrat Linda Sánchez of Lakewood since January 3, 2003.
Race ranking and details from CQ Politics
Campaign contributions from OpenSecrets
Race profile at The New York Times

District 40
 (map) has been represented by Republican Ed Royce of Fullerton since January 3, 2003, when he was redistricted from the 39th district.
Race ranking and details from CQ Politics
Campaign contributions from OpenSecrets
Race profile at The New York Times

District 41
 (map) has been represented by Republican Jerry Lewis of Redlands since January 3, 2003, when he was redistricted from the 40th district.
Race ranking and details from CQ Politics
Campaign contributions from OpenSecrets
Race profile at The New York Times

District 42
 (map) has been represented by Republican Gary Miller of Diamond Bar since January 3, 2003, when he was redistricted from the 41st district.
Race ranking and details from CQ Politics
Campaign contributions from OpenSecrets
Race profile at The New York Times

District 43
 (map) has been represented by Democrat Joe Baca of Rialto since January 3, 2003, when he was redistricted from the 42nd district.
Race ranking and details from CQ Politics
Campaign contributions from OpenSecrets
Race profile at The New York Times

District 44
 (map) has been represented by Republican Ken Calvert of Corona since January 3, 2003, when he was redistricted from the 43rd district.
Race ranking and details from CQ Politics
Campaign contributions from OpenSecrets
Race profile at The New York Times

District 45
 (map) has been represented by Republican Mary Bono Mack of Palm Springs since January 3, 2003, when she was redistricted from the 44th district.
Race ranking and details from CQ Politics
Campaign contributions from OpenSecrets
Race profile at The New York Times

District 46
 (map) has been represented by Republican Dana Rohrabacher of Huntington Beach since January 3, 2003, when he was redistricted from the 45th district.
Race ranking and details from CQ Politics
Campaign contributions from OpenSecrets
Race profile at The New York Times

District 47
 (map) has been represented by Democrat Loretta Sanchez of Anaheim since January 3, 2003, when she was redistricted from the 46th district.
Race ranking and details from CQ Politics
Campaign contributions from OpenSecrets
Race profile at The New York Times

District 48
 (map) has been represented by Republican John Campbell of Irvine since January 3, 2005.
Race ranking and details from CQ Politics
Campaign contributions from OpenSecrets
Race profile at The New York Times

District 49
 (map) has been represented by Republican Darrell Issa of Vista since January 3, 2003, when he was redistricted from the 48th district.
Race ranking and details from CQ Politics
Campaign contributions from OpenSecrets
Race profile at The New York Times

District 50
 (map) has been represented by Republican Brian Bilbray of Carlsbad since June 13, 2006.
Race ranking and details from CQ Politics
Campaign contributions from OpenSecrets
Race profile at The New York Times

District 51
 (map) has been represented by Democrat Bob Filner of San Diego since January 3, 2003, when he was redistricted from the 50th district.
Race ranking and details from CQ Politics
Campaign contributions from OpenSecrets
Race profile at The New York Times

District 52
 (map) has been represented by Republican Duncan D. Hunter of Lakeside since January 3, 2009.
Race ranking and details from CQ Politics
Campaign contributions from OpenSecrets
Race profile at The New York Times

District 53
 (map) has been represented by Democrat Susan Davis of San Diego since January 3, 2003, when she was redistricted from the 49th district.
Race ranking and details from CQ Politics
Campaign contributions from OpenSecrets
Race profile at The New York Times

References

External links
Elections and Voter Information at the California Secretary of State
CA Secretary of State 2010 Elections Results Page includes updated results of the 2010 elections in California as counties continue to tally their ballots and post vote totals
Official candidate list
U.S. Congress candidates for California at Project Vote Smart
California U.S. House from OurCampaigns.com
Campaign contributions for U.S. Congressional races in California from OpenSecrets
2010 California General Election graph of multiple polls from Pollster.com
California General Election Semi-Official Election Results from California Secretary of State

House - California from the Cook Political Report

2010 California elections
California
2010